Adriana Lamar (1909-1946) was a Mexican film actress. She appeared in thirty four films until her death at the age of thirty eight in 1946. She was married to the actor Ramón Pereda, with whom she co-starred in several films.

Selected filmography
 Sanctuary (1933)
 La Llorona (1933)
 Women of Today (1936)
 These Men (1937)
 Beautiful Mexico (1938)
 Jesus of Nazareth (1942)
 Arsenio Lupin (1947)

References

Bibliography
  Lisa Jarvinen. The Rise of Spanish-Language Filmmaking: Out from Hollywood's Shadow, 1929-1939. Rutgers University Press, 2012.

External links

1909 births
1946 deaths
Mexican film actresses